The sixth season of the American television comedy series How I Met Your Mother premiered on September 20, 2010, and concluded on May 16, 2011 on CBS.

Cast

Main cast
 Josh Radnor as Ted Mosby
 Jason Segel as Marshall Eriksen
 Cobie Smulders as Robin Scherbatsky
 Neil Patrick Harris as Barney Stinson
 Alyson Hannigan as Lily Aldrin
 Bob Saget (uncredited) as Future Ted Mosby (voice only)

Recurring cast
 Lyndsy Fonseca as Penny, Ted's Daughter
 David Henrie as Luke, Ted's Son
 Marshall Manesh as Ranjit
 Bob Odenkirk as Arthur Hobbs
 Jennifer Morrison as Zoey Pierson
 Laura Bell Bundy as Becky
 Kyle MacLachlan as The Captain
 Bill Fagerbakke as Marvin Eriksen Sr.
 Ned Rolsma as Marcus Eriksen
 Suzie Plakson as Judy Eriksen
 Chris Romano as Punchy
 Nazanin Boniadi as Nora

Guest cast

 Maury Povich as himself
 Rachel Bilson as Cindy
 Frances Conroy as Loretta Stinson
 Wayne Brady as James Stinson
 Ben Vereen as Sam Gibbs
 Will Forte as Randy Wharmpess
 Nicole Scherzinger as Jessica Glitter
 Alan Thicke as himself
 Jorge Garcia as Steve "The Blitz" Henry
 Alex Trebek as himself
 Kaylee DeFer as Casey, Cindy's girlfriend (girl at the bar)

 Danny Strong as Trey
 Michael Gross as Alfred Mosby
 Ray Wise as Robin Scherbatsky, Sr.
 Katy Perry as Honey
 Alexis Denisof as Sandy Rivers
 John Lithgow as Jerome "Jerry" Whittaker
 Robbie Amell as Scooby
 Michael Trucco as Nick Podarutti
 Dave Foley as Jake Bloom

Episodes

Reception
Season six of How I Met Your Mother was met with mostly positive reviews.

Ratings

U.S. Nielsen Ratings

Australian ratings

References

External links
 

6
2010 American television seasons
2011 American television seasons